The 1926 Southwestern Louisiana Bulldogs football team was an American football team that represented the Southwestern Louisiana Institute of Liberal and Technical Learning (now known as the University of Louisiana at Lafayette) in the Southern Intercollegiate Athletic Association during the 1926 college football season. In their eighth year under head coach T. R. Mobley, the team compiled a 6–3–1 record.

Schedule

References

Southwestern Louisiana
Louisiana Ragin' Cajuns football seasons
Southwestern Louisiana Bulldogs football